The Peterhouse partbooks are a collection of English partbooks dating from the sixteenth and seventeenth centuries. They are named "Peterhouse" after Peterhouse in Cambridge, where the books were kept for some time, and are now preserved in the Cambridge University Library. They are handwritten manuscripts, all written on paper. At some point in the mid-eighteenth century, the books were rebound, although the foliation and indices remained unchanged.

Partbooks 
In partbook format, each of the voice parts has its own book; hence, here, there are separate books for the Triplex, Medius, Contratenor, Tenor, Bassus, and Organ parts. Partbooks were a practical way of circulating polyphony; each voice part could be copied much more quickly in separate volumes than in score format, individual books used less paper overall than one single volume in score format, they were cheaper to produce and easier for larger groups to sing from, and each singer only needed to carry one smaller volume. However, the disadvantage to the partbook format is that a small individual volume was easy to lose, and if any of the partbooks went missing, the others were potentially rendered useless. Such is the case with the Peterhouse partbooks; only seventeen currently survive out of what appears to have originally been twenty-three books.

Content 
The partbooks can be divided up into two separate collections. The "Henrician" set consists of four surviving books (Triplex, Medius, Contratenor, and Bassus, MS. 31–32 and 40–41), with the Tenor book missing and with several pages missing from the beginning of the Triplex. These books contain pieces exclusively set in Latin; they were all written by a single scribe between 1539 and 1541, and do not seem to have been used much, as there are numerous errors that were never corrected. As such, it is possible that they were copied more like an anthology than a set for practical or current use, and as the English Reformation and the dissolution of the monasteries under Henry VIII continued, it may be that much of the repertory preserved in the partbooks fell from favor, or would have been considered politically ill-advised, shortly thereafter.

The "Caroline" set consists of nineteen books (MS. 31–53, minus the Henrician set listed above), four of which (two Tenor books, MS. 50 and 52, and two Contratenor books, MS. 51 and 53) have been lost. This collection dates to between 1625 and 1640, although they were assembled together later, and are much more diverse than the Henrician set. The books contain pieces in both Latin and English, including Services, and were copied by numerous scribes of varying ability, several of whom are composers of works in this set of partbooks.

The two sets are numbered inconsistently due to the order in which they were re-discovered. They were found, described, and cataloged by John Jebb, rector of Peterstown, Herefordshire, in the 1850s, at which point they were rebound in their current format. Some of the partbooks were found much later than others; three of those from the Caroline set, for example, were located in 1926 in a space behind the panelling of the Perne library, where presumably they had been hidden to protect them from the Puritans. Additionally, a second numbering system was applied to photocopies made of the partbooks, though these were made after the four lost books of the Caroline set went missing.

The music preserved in the partbooks is entirely sacred, consisting of Masses, Magnificats, Services, anthems, and motets. The partbooks are exceptional for their preservation both of famous composers, such as Thomas Tallis, William Byrd, and Robert Fayrfax, and much lesser-known composers such as Arthur Chamberlayne, John Darke, John Norman, and Johann Hector Beck. Only two works in the Henrician set are by non-English composers: the motet "Aspice Domine" is elsewhere ascribed to Jacquet de Mantua, and a Mass based on the motet "Surrexit pastor bonus" by Andreas de Silva is labeled by a "Lupus Italus" in the partbooks, but it is unclear who this composer might be.

A complete list of the composers represented in the Peterhouse partbooks is given below.

The Peterhouse partbooks are related to other contemporary groups of partbooks, including the Forrest-Heyther (Oxford, Bodleian Library, Mus.Sch.e.376–81), Christ Church (Oxford, Christ Church Library, Mus.979–83), Wanley (Oxford, Bodleian Library, Mus.Sch.e.420–22) and Gyffard (London, British Library, Add MSS 17802–17805) partbooks, as well as British Library Royal Appendix MSS 45–48, among others.

Complete list of composers

Henrician set

 Anonymous  
 William Alen  
 Thomas Appleby  
 Hugh Aston  
 Richard Bramston  
 Catcott  
 Arthur Chamberlayne  
 John Darke  
 Edwarde  
 Walter Erley [Erell]

 Robert Fayrfax  
 Richard Hunt  
 Robert Jones  
 Thomas Knyght  
 Nicholas Ludford  
 Lupus/Lupus Italus 
 Jacquet of Mantua  
 Edward Martyn  
 John Mason
 John Merbecke  

 John Norman  
 John Northbrooke [Northbroke]  
 William Pasche  
 Richard Pygott  
 William Rasar [Rasor]  
 Hugh Sturmys  
 Thomas Tallis  
 John Taverner  
 Christopher Tye  
 William Whytbrook [Whytbroke]

Caroline set

 Anonymous
 John Amner
 Adelard of Bath
 Adrian Batten [Battin, Battyn]
 Johann Hector Beck
 John Bennett
 Edward Blancke
 Thomas Boyce
 John Bull
 William Byrd
 William Child
 William Cranford [Cranforth]
 Richard Dering [Deering, Dearing, Diringus]
 Derrick Gerarde [Dethick, Dyricke, Theodoricus, Gerard, Gerardus, Gerrarde]
 Michael East
 John Ferrant [Farrant]
 Richard Ferrant
 Alfonso Ferrabosco
 John Fido [Fidoe, Fidow, Fidor]
 John Geeres
 Orlando Gibbons
 Gibbons/W. Smith
 Nathaniel Giles [Gyles]
 John Heath I

 John Hilton the Elder
 John Hilton the Younger
 Henry Hinde
 Edmund Hooper
 Hughes
 J. Hutchinson
 Richard Hutchinson
 Matthew Jeffries
 Juxon
 R. Knight
 Laud
 Henry Loosemore
 John Lugge
 Thomas Mace
 Marson
 Henry Molle
 Thomas Morley
 Henry Mudd [Harry, Moode, Moud, Mudge]
 William Mundy
 Henry Palmer
 Osbert Parsley
 Robert Parsons
 Nathaniel Patrick
 Martin Peerson [Pearson]

 Philips
 Richard Portman
 Robert Ramsey
 John Shepherd
 Edward Smith
 J. Smith
 William Smith I
 Robert Stevenson
 William Stonard [Stoner, Stonerd, Stonnard]
 Nicholas Strogers
 Thomas Tallis
 John Taverner
 Thomas Tomkins
 Christopher Tye
 John Ward
 Thomas Warwick
 Thomas Weelkes
 Robert White [Whyte]
 W. White
 Robert Wilkinson [Wylkynson]
 Thomas Wilson
 Leonard Woodson

Modern recordings and reconstructions
Because of the missing partbooks, much of the music in the Peterhouse partbooks had not ever been recorded until recently. Nicholas Sandon, however, has spent numerous years researching the Peterhouse partbooks and has devoted considerable time to reconstructing lost vocal parts.  Sandon was formerly Professor of Music at University College, Cork and at Exeter University, and now acts as general editor of Antico Edition, which is publishing his reconstructions of the music found in the Peterhouse Partbooks.

Based on Sandon's reconstructions, the Boston-based early music ensemble Blue Heron is about to release its fifth of a planned five-CD series of music from the Henrician set of the Peterhouse partbooks, including compositions by Hugh Aston, Robert Jones, John Mason, Nicholas Ludford, Richard Pygott, and Robert Hunt. Additionally, the Seattle-based Byrd Ensemble released the album Our Lady: Music from the Peterhouse Partbooks, also based on Sandon's reconstructions, in 2011.

References

Further reading

External links
Henrician Set
 TRIPLEX
 MEDIUS
 CONTRATENOR
 BASSUS

Caroline Set

"Former"
 CANTORIS MEDIUS
 CANTORIS CONTRATENOR I
 CANTORIS BASSUS
 DECANI MEDIUS
 DECANI CONTRATENOR I
 DECANI CONTRATENOR II
 DECANI BASSUS

"Latter"
 CANTORIS MEDIUS
 CANTORIS TENOR
 CANTORIS BASSUS
 DECANI MEDIUS
 DECANI CONTRATENOR
 DECANI TENOR
 DECANI BASSUS
 ORGAN

Music sources